Ingalls House may refer to:
Ingalls House (Mercer, Maine), listed on the NRHP in Maine
Ingalls House (De Smet, South Dakota), listed on the NRHP in South Dakota
Ingalls-Wheeler-Horton Homestead Site, Rehoboth, MA, listed on the NRHP in Massachusetts
Wheeler-Ingalls House, Rehoboth, MA, listed on the NRHP in Massachusetts
Laura Ingalls Wilder House, Mansfield, MO, listed on the NRHP in Missouri